Mehdī Nāderī (born 17 April 1973 in Najafabad) is an Iranian film director. He started directing theater in 1988.  He has directed documentaries and fiction films.  He is also a producer, scriptwriter, advisor and editor.

His debut feature film Farewell Baghdad was Iran's entry to the 83rd Academy Awards for Best Foreign Language Film, but it didn't make the final shortlist.

Filmography

As a director and scriptwriter

As Writer

As Editor

Awards
Farewell Baghdad

 2010 Best film - Baghdad Film Festival (Iraq)
 2010 elected Iran's Official Submission to the 2011 Best Foreign Language Film Oscar of the Academy of Motion Picture Arts and Sciences (AMPAS)

Rahman: Four Stories (by Alīrezā Nāderī) 
 2009 Best film-theater editing - FAJR Theater Festival (Iran)

Forgotten Dreams 
 2008 Best cinema student Film award - Haqiqat Film Festival (Iran)

Farāri (by hamid ghavami ) 
 2008 Best Experimental Editing - IYCS-Film Festival (Iran)

Dokhterān-e Āftāb
 2006 - ... - National Women Film Festival (Iran)
 2003 Paulig Baltic's Prize - Parnu Film Festival (Estonia)
 2003 Best Documentary - Tampere Film Festival (Finland)
 2003 Recognition - International FAJR Film Festival (Iran)

Gozāresh zir-e zamīn  
 2004 Best research - Documentary Film Tehran University (Iran)
 2004 Special Jury Award - International Short Film Festival (Iran)
 2003 Best Documentary Directing - Khaneh Cinema Board (Iran)
 2003 Best fiction documentary film - Heritage Film Festival (Iran)

Festival 
 2000 Urkunde - Festival der Nationen. Ebensee (Austria)

Fifth Ring 
 1997 Best National Shortfilm - International Short Film Festival (Iran)

References

 Die Welt;Hanns-Georg Rodek; 2010-09-22
 Interview with Reuters; 2010-12-10

External links
 Official Website 

Iranian film directors
Persian-language film directors
Living people
1973 births
People from Najafabad